Loreto International Airport  is an international airport located in the city of Loreto, in Loreto Municipality of Baja California Sur state, northwestern Mexico.

Services
The airport handles national and international air traffic for the city of Loreto and northern Baja California Sur state.

It is operated by Aeropuertos y Servicios Auxiliares, a federal government-owned corporation. It is capable of handling aircraft the size of Boeing 737s and Airbus A320s. Mainly it receives Embraer ERJ 145s, Bombardier CRJs, and Boeing 737s.

Aeromexico flew to several domestic and international destinations in past years, but service was cancelled in 2014. Currently, the airport has regular international flights to Los Angeles and seasonal service to Calgary.

In 2021, the airport handled 101,692 passengers, and in 2022, it handled  131,933 passengers.

Airlines and destinations

Passenger

Statistics

Passengers

Accidents and incidents
 Aeroméxico Flight 498, also known as the 1986 Cerritos mid-air collision: On August 31, 1986, an Aeroméxico DC-9 that originated from Mexico City and stopped at Loreto and other Mexican destinations collided with a private aircraft while descending into Los Angeles International Airport, killing all 67 passengers on both aircraft and an additional 15 people on the ground.

See also 

List of the busiest airports in Mexico

References

External links
 Loreto International Airport

Airports in Baja California Sur
Loreto Municipality (Baja California Sur)